The Japan Skating Federation is the sports governing body of Japan for figure skating, speed skating, and short track speed skating. It was founded in 1929. The current president (since 2019) is Akihisa Nagashima, a member of the House of Representatives of Japan.

External links
Official website
Official results and data page

Skating Association
Japan
International Skating Union
Ice skating in Japan